Kodie is a small town and is the capital of Afigya-Kwabre South district, a district in the Ashanti Region of Ghana.

References 

Populated places in the Ashanti Region